"Drunken Sailor", also known as "What Shall We Do with a/the Drunken Sailor?" or "Up She Rises", is a traditional sea shanty, listed as No. 322 in the Roud Folk Song Index. It was sung onboard sailing ships at least as early as the 1830s, and it shares its tune with the traditional Irish folk song "Óró sé do bheatha abhaile".

The song's lyrics vary, but usually contain some variant of the question, "What shall we do with a drunken sailor, early in the morning?" In some styles of performance, each successive verse suggests a method of sobering or punishing the drunken sailor. In other styles, further questions are asked and answered about different people.

"Drunken Sailor" was revived as a popular song among non-sailors in the 20th century, and grew to become one of the best-known songs of the shanty repertoire among mainstream audiences. It has been performed and recorded by many musical artists and appeared regularly in popular culture.

History

Origin and melody 

The authorship and origin of the song are unknown, but it shares its tune with the traditional Irish folk song "Óró sé do bheatha abhaile".  It is in the Dorian mode.

As a sea shanty
The song was sung to accompany certain work tasks aboard sailing ships, especially those that required a bright walking pace. It is believed to originate in the early 19th century or earlier, during a period when ships' crews, especially those of military vessels, were large enough to permit hauling a rope whilst simply marching along the deck. With the advent of merchant packet and clipper ships and their smaller crews, which required different working methods, use of the shanty appears to have declined or shifted to other, minor tasks.

The first published description of the shanty is found in an account of an 1839 whaling voyage out of New London, Connecticut, to the Pacific Ocean. It was used as an example of a song that was "performed with very good effect when there is a long line of men hauling together". The tune was noted, along with these lyrics:

Although this is the earliest discovered published mention, there is some indication that the shanty is at least as old as the 1820s. In Eckstorm and Smyth's collection Minstrelsy of Maine (published 1927), the editors note that one of their grandmothers, who sang the song, claimed to have heard it used during the task of tacking on the Penobscot River "probably [by the time of the editor's reportage] considerably over a hundred years ago".

Despite these indications of the song's existence in the first half of the 19th century, references to it are rare. They include a reference in a work of fiction from 1855 in which a drunken female cook is portrayed singing,

A five-verse set of lyrics and tune were published in the third edition of Davis and Tozer's shanty collection, Sailor Songs or 'Chanties. However, the title did not appear in any of the other major shanty collections or articles of the 19th century.

When John Masefield next published the lyrics in 1906, he called it a "bastard variety" of shanty which was "seldom used"—an assertion supported by the lack of many earlier references. This style of shanty, called a "runaway chorus" by Masefield, and as a "stamp and go" or "walk away" shanty by others, was said to be used for tacking and which was sung in "quick time". The verses in Masefield's version asked what to do with a "drunken sailor", followed by a response, then followed by a question about a "drunken soldier", with an appropriate response.

Capt. W. B. Whall, a veteran English sailor of the 1860s–70s, was the next author to publish on "Drunken Sailor". He claimed that this was one of only two shanties that was sung in the British Royal Navy (where singing at work was generally frowned upon). Moreover, the song had largely gone out of use as a "walk away" shanty when the size of ships' crews was reduced and it was no longer possible to use that working method. The lyrics given by Whall are essentially the same as those from Masefield: about a "drunken sailor", then a "drunken soldier". Significantly, he stated that these were the only lyrics, as evidently the task did not take long to complete.

The above-mentioned and other veteran sailors characterized "Drunken Sailor" as a "walk away" shanty, thus providing a possible explanation for why it was not noted more often in the second half of the 19th century. Later sailors' recollections, however, attested that the song continued to be used as a shanty, but for other purposes. Richard Maitland, an American sailor of the 1870s, sang it for song collector Alan Lomax in 1939, when he explained,

Now this is a song that's usually sang when men are walking away with the slack of a rope, generally when the iron ships are scrubbing their bottom. After an iron ship has been twelve months at sea, there's a quite a lot of barnacles and grass grows onto her bottom. And generally, in the calm latitudes, up in the horse latitudes in the North Atlantic Ocean, usually they rig up a purchase for to scrub the bottom.

Another American sailor of the 1870s, Frederick Pease Harlow, wrote in his shanty collection that "Drunken Sailor" could be used when hauling a halyard in "hand over hand" fashion to hoist the lighter sails. This would be in contradistinction to the much more typical "halyards shanties", which were for heavier work with an entirely different sort of pacing and formal structure. Another author to ascribe a function, Richard Runciman Terry, also said it could be used for "hand over hand" hauling. Terry was one of few writers, however, to also state the shanty was used for heaving the windlass or capstan.

In 1906, Percy Grainger recorded Charles Rosher of London, England, singing "What shall we do with a drunken sailor", and the recording is available online via the British Library Sound Archive. The folklorist James Madison Carpenter recorded several veteran sailors singing the song in the 1920s and 30s, which can be heard online courtesy of the Vaughan Williams Memorial Library.

As a popular song
"Drunken Sailor" began its life as a popular song on land at least as early as the 1900s, by which time it had been adopted as repertoire for glee singing at Eton College. Elsewhere in England, by the 1910s, men had begun to sing it regularly at gatherings of the Savage Club of London.

 
The song became popular on land in America as well. A catalogue of "folk-songs" from the Midwest included it in 1915, where it was said to be sung while dancing "a sort of reel". More evidence of lands-folk's increasing familiarity with "Drunken Sailor" comes in the recording of a "Drunken Sailor Medley" (c. 1923) by U.S. Old Time fiddler John Baltzell. Evidently the tune's shared affinities with Anglo-Irish-American dance tunes helped it to become readapted as such, as Baltzell included it among a set of reels.

Classical composers utilized the song in compositions. Australian composer Percy Grainger incorporated the song into his piece "Scotch Strathspey And Reel" (1924). Malcolm Arnold used its melody in his Three Shanties for Woodwind Quintet, Op. 4 (1943).

The glut of writings on sailors' songs and published collections that came starting in the 1920s supported a revival of interest in shanty-singing for entertainment purposes on land. As such, R. R. Terry's very popular shanty collection, which had begun to serve as a resource for renditions of shanties on commercial recordings in the 1920s, was evidently used by the Robert Shaw Chorale for their 1961 rendition. The Norman Luboff Choir recorded the song in 1959 with the uncharacteristic phrasing, "What'll we do...?"

The song shares the same tune with a Lent hymn, We Have A King Who Rides A Donkey which was written by Fred Kaan.

Notable recordings and performances

The song has been widely recorded under a number of titles by a range of performers including Black Lagoon, The King's Singers, Pete Seeger, The Blaggards, U.K. Subs, and most notably The Irish Rovers. It also forms part of a contrapuntal section in the BBC Radio 4 UK Theme by Fritz Spiegl, in which it is played alongside Greensleeves. The song's accordion version is used in the Nickelodeon TV series, SpongeBob SquarePants, often in scenes involving the Krusty Krab. It was also played on Cartoon network Camp Lazlo Tree Hugger. Note that some version sing "what will we do with the drunken sailor" instead of shall

For over 50 years The Irish Rovers have played the song as their usual show-closer. Several of their recordings of the song, sometimes under the name "Weigh Hey and up She Rises" have "gone viral" on YouTube. As a response, the band released the 2012 album, "Drunken Sailor" including the title track and a prequel that tells the earlier life of the 'Drunken Sailor', called "Whores and Hounds".

An instrumental remix of the song is heard in the DS version of Rayman Raving Rabbids 2.

Don Janse produced an arrangement in the early 1960s which has been included in several choral music anthologies. The arrangement was first recorded by The Idlers, and has been performed by several collegiate groups over the years, including the Yale Alley Cats.

Pere Ubu's 1978 song "Caligari's Mirror" is a post-punk reworking of "Drunken Sailor."

In the 1998 film The Truman Show, Truman Burbank, played by Jim Carrey sings the shanty while piloting a boat through a storm near the end of the movie. 

LeperKhanz recorded a version of the song on the album Tiocfaidh Ár Lá (2005).

Dwight Schrute sings a refrain of this shanty while under the false impression he is piloting the boat in the 11th episode of The Office (US) 2nd season, “Booze Cruise”.

The melody was also utilized by NFL Films composer Sam Spence for his track "Up as She Rises."

A version of the song appears in the 2012 stealth video-game Dishonored. This version is called "The Drunken Whaler" however, tying into the video game's fictional world; where whaling is a prominent and important industry. The verses in this version all result in the subject whaler's death, such as "feed him to the hungry rats for dinner" (a reference to the rat plague that was a major plot point in the title).

Another version of the song by Sean Dagher, Michiel Schrey, and Nils Brown appears in the 2013 action-adventure video game Assassin's Creed IV: Black Flag.

The British group Lord Rockingham's XI used the tune as the basis for their instrumental "Long John".

The Russian band Aquarium has a song called "What should we do with a drunken sailor?".

In Ringo Starr's rendition of "You're Sixteen", Starr is heard singing the chorus of the song in the fade at the end.

The film Fisherman's Friends (2019, Chris Foggin), based on a true story, features a Cornish group of fishermen who sing the song en route to hitting the pop charts and touring to this day. The song also features prominently in the end credits.

In The Wild Wild West episode "The Night of Miguelito's Revenge", Michael Dunn sings this song.

In the videogame Tiny Tina's Wonderlands, the player will meet a skeleton pirate who sings a variation on the song. The words drunken sailor are replaced with rhyming phrases such as funky whaler.

German pop group Dschinghis Khan released a version on their 1981 album Wir sitzen alle im selben Boot.

Song text

Pronunciation of "early"
Publications in the 19th and early 20th century, however, made no note of a stylized or vernacular pronunciation. Almost all of the available field recordings, including those by James Madison Carpenter in the 1920s use the usual pronunciation . However, one of Carpenter's recordings of a man named Tom Leary of Olin, North Carolina, which can be heard online, does in fact use this pronunciation.

The opera singer Leonard Warren recorded the song in July 1947 with the  pronunciation. The influential shanty collector Stan Hugill (1961) subsequently wrote that the word was always pronounced  .

References

Further reading
Stan Hugill, Shanties from the Seven Seas Mystic Seaport Museum 1994

External links
Example version with lyrics.
Another example version with lyrics and alternative chorus.
 Ubisoft's version from the game Black Flag
 An example of a high school male choir singing the version arranged by Robert Shaw and Alice Parker.
 The sheet music
An Irish Rovers version

19th-century songs
Sea shanties
Songs about alcohol
Songs about sailors
English children's songs
English folk songs
Year of song unknown
Songwriter unknown